John S. Bowers House is a historic home located at Decatur, Adams County, Indiana.  It was built between 1900–1905, and is a three-story, Queen Anne style frame dwelling with 14 rooms.  It sits on a stone foundation. It features stained glass and lead crystal windows and wraparound porch with Tuscan order columns.  It was built by John S. Bowers, who owned a local quarry.

It was listed on the National Register of Historic Places in 1979.

References

Houses on the National Register of Historic Places in Indiana
Queen Anne architecture in Indiana
Houses completed in 1905
Houses in Adams County, Indiana
National Register of Historic Places in Adams County, Indiana
1905 establishments in Indiana